Marshallville is the name of several places in the United States:

 Marshallville, Georgia
 Marshallville, Kentucky
 Marshallville, New Jersey
 Marshallville, Ohio